Glynn Academy (GA) is an American public high school in Brunswick, Georgia, United States, enrolling 1,900 students in grades 9–12. Along with Brunswick High School, it is one of two high schools in the Glynn County School System. Glynn Academy offers technical, academic, and Advanced Placement programs and is accredited by the Georgia Department of Education and the Southern Association of Colleges and Schools. The school has consistently been ranked among the top public high schools in the United States by Newsweek.

Chartered by an act of the Georgia General Assembly on February 1, 1788, Glynn Academy is the second-oldest public high school outside of New England and the seventh-oldest public high school in the United States; at its inception, the school embraced all grades of primary and secondary education. The first recorded building was built in 1819 on a tract of land known as Academy Range. A new building was erected in 1840 on Hillsborough Square, the present location of the school. From 1819 to 1840, the school was known as Glynn County Academy. Because of an unsatisfactory courthouse, the county's superior and inferior courts often met at the school from 1825 to 1884. In 1889, the Annex Building was constructed, followed by the Prep Junior High School in 1909 (later annexed to the school as the Prep Building), and the Glynn Academy Building in 1923. The original 1840 structure was moved out of the city in 1915; in 2008, it was relocated to the current campus where it serves as an interpretive museum.  The 1840 building itself is on the National Register of Historic Places and three other buildings (the Prep Building, 1905–09; the G.A. building, 1922; and the Annex, 1889) are contributing properties to the Brunswick Old Town Historic District.

The school, in addition to serving sections of Brunswick, serves Brookman, Blythe Island, Sea Island, and St. Simons Island. It also serves sections of Country Club Estates and Dock Junction.

History
On February 1, 1788, Glynn Academy was created by an act of the General Assembly of Georgia making it the second oldest high school in Georgia. For more than a century the name "Glynn Academy" included all grades of public school from young learners to senior high school students. In 1888, one hundred years after its founding, Glynn Academy records show a graduating class consisting of four girls and two boys.

State Titles
Baseball (1) - 1973(3A) 
Football (1) - 1964(3A) 
Boys' Golf (13) - 1981(4A), 1982(4A), 1984(4A), 1987(4A), 1988(4A), 1989(4A), 1992(4A), 1994(4A), 2000(4A), 2001(5A), 2004(5A), 2005(5A), 2011(4A) 
Girls' Golf (7) - 2002(5A), 2004(5A), 2005(5A), 2006(5A), 2007(4A), 2010(4A), 2011(4A) 
Boys Track (1) - 1977(3A)

Other GHSA State Titles
One Act Play (1) - 2019(6A)

Campus

Buildings 

Renovation of the School Buildings started in 2016.
The Prep Building was renovated in 2017.
The Sidney Lanier Building was renovated in 2019.
The Science Building finished renovations in 2020.

Other Campus Buildings and Additional Information

Constructed in 2014, the tennis complex features 10 lighted courts — allowing Glynn Academy to host competitive tournaments — along with fencing, some additional parking spaces and a large building which holds concessions and restrooms. John Tuten was also the architect for the tennis complex.

Memorial Plaza and the Veterans Memorial Wall are both notable places that are centrally located on campus.

The building used as the previous cafeteria is serving as temporary classrooms during renovations of other buildings.

New Glynn Academy Athletic Complex
(Officially Completed in 2018)
A lighted baseball field and parking lot  built on the site of the current Glynn Middle School football field. A lighted softball field will be constructed south of the baseball field, along with an additional parking lot along Lanier Blvd.

On the site's southwest side, there will be a full-size football/soccer field inside a regulation 400-meter track.

A 13,000-square foot indoor batting and pitching facility will also house boy's and girl's locker rooms, a concession stand and restroom facilities.

Old Glynn Academy Building 
Built in 1840, the Old Glynn Academy Building was the first building on Hillsborough Square, the present location of the Glynn Academy campus; it is the oldest wooden schoolhouse in Georgia and the second oldest wooden schoolhouse in America.   This building served as the only public school building in Brunswick for more than fifty years. In 1915, it was disassembled and reassembled in Sterling, an unincorporated community in northern Glynn County. There, it served as a consolidated school for African-American students. After desegregation, it became a county-maintained community center for Sterling residents.

In 2008, the Old Glynn Academy Building was relocated to Hillsborough Square. It now serves as an interpretive museum.  On November 4, 2011, the 1840 building was added to the National Register of Historic Places.

Wolfe Street Building 
Constructed in 2016, the Wolfe Street Building houses the Foreign Language Department and the Technology and Career Departments. The original Wolfe Street Building was built in the 1940s and stood where the new cafeteria (built in 2016) now stands. John Tuten was also the architect for this building.

Wood Gym 

The Wood Gym is the original gymnasium of Glynn Academy, named after a Brunswick resident who donated money to the school for physical education. The Wood Gym is now rarely in regular use by the student body, having been supplanted by a modern gymnasium across campus. The interior of the gymnasium has functioned as home to the varsity wrestling team during the winter months since their inaugural season in 1996. When necessary the gym interior area also functions for administering standardized testing, and occasionally, a physical education class takes place here. A full weight room has been installed for weight training classes.

Annex Building 

The Annex Building was built in 1889. On August 19, 2005, the Annex Building was severely damaged as the result of a lightning strike but has since been remodeled. It is a contributing property to the Brunswick Old Town Historic District.

Prep Building 

In the late-19th century, as the student population of Glynn Academy increased, the need arose for an additional facility to accommodate an expanding student body. Thus, the Prep Junior High School was constructed, serving as a bridge between elementary school and high school and serving sixth, seventh, and eighth grades. The school was later annexed to Glynn Academy.

Renovation of Prep Building was completed in early 2018.

The Prep Building is the most recognizable building on the campus due to its massive stairs and columns, and the now closed off tunnel that connects it to the Glynn Academy building. This building holds most of the foreign languages classes as well as the visual arts and music classes.  It is a contributing property to the Brunswick Old Town Historic District.

Glynn Academy Building 

The Glynn Academy Building is the main administrative building on campus. At the end of World War I, a new school building was erected as a memorial to the men of Glynn County who had fought in war. Funds for it were raised through a bond election and the Glynn Academy Building was completed in September 1923. Renovations took place in 1999. In an effort to memorialize the structure, the architect of the building, Hendrik Wallin, drew inspiration from the Louvain Library in Belgium whose destruction by the Germans infuriated the Allied Forces.

The Glynn Academy Building houses the Memorial Auditorium.  It is a contributing property to the Brunswick Old Town Historic District.

Sidney Lanier Building 

The Sidney Lanier Building, a former primary school, was incorporated into Glynn Academy in the early 1970s. It was built in 1936 and named for the poet Sidney Lanier, who wrote a set of lyrical nature poems known as the "Hymns of the Marshes" describing the vast open salt marshes off the coast of Georgia. There is a historical marker in Brunswick commemorating the writing of “The Marshes of Glynn.” The Sidney Lanier Building houses primarily social studies classes. The Sidney Lanier Building had renovations during the 2018–2019 school year and is finished.

Science Building 

The Science Building was completed in 1963 and houses the literature and science classes. The school's library is also located in the Science Building. The Science Building is now the oldest (meaning least renovated) building on campus and is building #1. Renovations finished in the summer of 2020.

Gym 
The "new" Gym was completed in 1983 to accommodate a growing student population. The Gym was designed by architect John Tuten, Glynn Academy Class of 1961. The Gym is affectionately known as "The Glass Palace." In November 2022, the Gym addition was completed which consists of a basketball court for classes, weight rooms, and office space for coaches. On December 3, 2022, the Gym basketball court was dedicated to Coach Theresa Adams.

Glynn Academy New Cafe 
The Glynn Academy Cafeteria serves as many as 2000 students and faculty daily. Construction of the new cafeteria building was completed by the end of the 2015–2016 school year. John Tuten was also the architect for this building.

Liberty Bell 

The bell in front of the Glynn Academy Building is a near replica of the Liberty Bell in Independence Hall, Philadelphia, Pennsylvania. It is mounted on a red brick base and totals about 2,000 pounds. In 1897, the bell was cast in bronze by McShane Foundry in Baltimore, Maryland and was used in the clock tower of Brunswick City Hall until the 1930s.

The Glynn Academy Student Council of 1968–1969 is credited with finding the Liberty Bell and assembling it on a plinth at the downtown campus. With the help of the Brunswick Fire Department and businessmen, parents and students, the bell was set during the 1969–1970 school year. The plaque at its base reads: "Erected by the Student Councils 1968–1969 and 1969–1970".

Notable alumni
 Kwame Brown – NBA player; Washington Wizards first overall pick in the 2001 NBA Draft
 Chance Calloway – author, director and singer; creator of the digital series Pretty Dudes
 Jeff Chapman – Georgia state senator (2004–2010) and state representative (2012–2014)
 DeeJay Dallas – NFL player; Seattle Seahawks (2020–present)
 Lamar Davis – wide receiver for the Georgia Bulldogs (1940–1942); AAFC player; Miami Seahawks (1946) and Baltimore Colts (1947–1949)
 Mel Lattany, track sprinter
 Davis Love III – PGA Tour player, 1997 PGA Champion
 Willie McClendon – running back for the Georgia Bulldogs (1975–1978); NFL player; Chicago Bears (1979–1982)
 Steve Melnyk – won U.S. Amateur and British Amateur in golf, Georgia Golf Hall of Fame
 George Rose – NFL player; Minnesota Vikings (1964–1966) and New Orleans Saints (1967)
 Adam Wainwright – MLB player; Saint Louis Cardinals; Atlanta Braves first round draft pick in the 2001 MLB Draft
 Jaelin Williams - soccer player, member of the Bahamas national football team
 Jack Podlesny – kicker for the Georgia Bulldogs (2018-2023)

See also
 Brunswick High School
National Register of Historic Places listings in Glynn County, Georgia

References

External links
 
 

Public high schools in Georgia (U.S. state)
Schools in Glynn County, Georgia
Brunswick, Georgia
Relocated buildings and structures in Georgia (U.S. state)
Educational institutions established in 1788